Bugger is a slang expletive used in vernacular English.
Bugger may also refer to:

 Buggers, a derogatory term for the Formics, an insectoid alien species in the Ender's Game series of novels
 Frito and Dildo Bugger, characters in Bored of the Rings, a parody of Lord of the Rings

See also
 Buggery, a legal term for unlawful anal sex
 Mount Buggery (Alpine Shire, Victoria), a mountain in the Australian state of Victoria
 Mount Buggery (Wangaratta, Victoria), a mountain in the Australian state of Victoria